Black Ops, also known as The Ascent or Stairs, is a 2019 independent action horror film directed by Tom Paton.

Plot
A special ops military team find themselves stuck on an endless staircase and must fix their past sins against civilians or die on the stairs.

Cast
 Shayne Ward as Will Stanton
 Bentley Kalu as Ben Garrett
 Samantha Schnitzler as Kia Clarke
 Alana Wallace as Hayley Nolan
 Toby Osmond as Jack Ford
 Sophie Austin as Emma Walker
 Spencer Collings as Carter Harris
 Simon Meacock as Shaun Buxton
 Phoebe Robinson-Galvin as Rachel Ryan
 Julia Szamalek as The Prisoner
 Matt Malecki as Mateus
 Rachel Warren as The Mother
 Piotr Baumann as Pavel

Release
The film premiered at the 2019 FrightFest on 26 August, and released on 12 June 2020 as direct to video on demand.

Reception
  It is described by reviewers as being either military horror, or action and horror.

References

External links
 

2019 films
2019 action thriller films
2019 independent films
British action thriller films
British independent films
2010s English-language films
2010s British films